
Year 496 BC was a year of the pre-Julian Roman calendar. At the time, it was known as the Year of the Consulship of Albus and Tricostus (or, less frequently, year 258 Ab urbe condita). The denomination 496 BC for this year has been used since the early medieval period, when the Anno Domini calendar era became the prevalent method in Europe for naming years.

Events 
 By place 

 Greece 
 Hipparchos, son of Charmos (a relative of the 6th century BC tyrant Peisistratus), wins the archonship of Athens as leader of the peace party which argues that resistance against the Persians is useless.

Tisicrates of Kroton wins the stadion race at the 71st Olympic Games.

 Roman Republic 
 The former Etruscan King of Rome, Tarquinius Superbus, who had been exiled by the Romans in 509 BC, and his ally Octavius Mamilius, of Tusculum, together with the Latins are defeated by the Roman Republic army in the Battle of Lake Regillus, near Frascati. The outcome of this battle establishes Roman supremacy over the Latins.

 China 
 King Goujian of Yue defeats and mortally injures King Helü of Wu

Births 
 Sophocles, Athenian dramatist and statesman (d. 406 BC)

Deaths 
 Sun Tzu, military philosopher and author of The Art of War (most likely a colloquial date) (b. 544 BC)
 King Helü of Wu, king of the Chinese State of Wu
 Marcus Valerius Volusus and Titus Herminius Aquilinus, both former Roman consuls died at the Battle of Lake Regillus
 Octavius Mamilius, ruler of Tusculum also died at the Battle of Lake Regillus
 Iccus of Epidaurus, Olympic boxer, died while boxing Cleomedes of Astypalaea

References